Public transport in Hamilton and the Waikato Region is poorly developed. Only 0.9% of trips were made by bus in 2013/14. This compares with 2.3% nationally, which itself is amongst the lowest modal shares in the world. A Mass Transit Plan aiming to increase public transport's share in Hamilton from 3 to 10% by running services at 10 minute intervals, was to be developed in 2019, but has yet to be funded by NZTA. Waikato, like all other regions, with the exception of Auckland and Wellington, saw falls in use of public transport from 2012. As the map shows, the coverage is sparse and, even of those services which operate daily, most have only 2 or 3 buses a day in each direction. Only Hamilton urban services and those to Huntly run hourly, or more frequently. About 40% of passengers travel on the two routes (Orbiter, Comet) which run at 15 minute intervals. From Monday 21 February 2022 the less frequent Hamilton buses were cut to hourly, or 2-hourly, due to driver shortages.

Hamilton has 23 bus routes covering most of its urban area. Buses also serve Cambridge, Coromandel, Huntly, Mangakino, Matamata, Morrinsville, Ngāruawāhia, Paeroa, Port Waikato, Pukekohe, Raglan, Taupō, Thames, Te Aroha, Te Awamutu, Te Kauwhata, Tīrau, Putāruru and Tokoroa. A summer shuttle runs between Hahei and Cathedral Cove. Services are operated by 105 buses, 74 of them on Hamilton urban routes.

Since the sale of the west Hamilton routes in 2018, all Hamilton buses have been operated by GoBus (successor to Buses Ltd – see Hamilton routes below). From 30 September 2017 Pavlovich Coachlines had operated buses in west Hamilton and, prior to that, just the Orbiter.

InterCity operate long-distance bus services and some regional connections.

Te Huia commuter train started on 6 April  2021 and runs 6 days a week to Auckland Strand. The only other remaining passenger train is the Northern Explorer.

Ferries remain at Whitianga, Tairua and linking Auckland and Coromandel.

On 19 July 2021 a ferry service began on the Waikato River, linking Swarbrick's Landing and Braithwaite Park with the museum and gardens.

Shuttle buses provide the only public transport to a number of places, including Hamilton Airport, Whitianga and Whangamatā. Until 2017 Tairua Bus served Whitianga and Ngatea and still provides some shuttles.

Bus routes

Hamilton City routes

SH1 routes to Cambridge and south east – current route 20

SH1 routes to Huntly and north west – current routes 21 and 44

SH26 routes to Morrinsville and SH2 routes to east – current routes 22 and 25

SH23 routes to west coast – current route 23

SH3 routes to Te Awamutu and south west – current route 24

Education and Health buses 

In addition to the buses of commercial operators and those supported by Regional Council, there is a large network of buses serving schools and a much smaller one serving hospitals. The first school bus in the country ran in Waikato on 1 April 1924, allowing local schools near Piopio to be closed. Many companies now run school bus services, including GoBus, Cambridge Travel Lines and Murphy. The Ministry of Education set 1 July 2018 as a date to withdraw ten school buses it considered could be accommodated on public buses. However, that was reduced to a possible two (Cambridge to St Johns and Morrinsville to Sacred Heart) in 2017.

The health buses are mainly funded by the District Health Board and link Waikato Hospital to most of the regions towns and some outside the region, such as Taumarunui.

From February 2017 University of Waikato is using car parking fees to subsidise student fares by 30% and provide new bus links to Tokoroa, Putāruru, Ngāruawāhia, Huntly, Te Kauwhata, Thames, Piopio, Te Kuiti, Ōtorohanga, Matamata, Coromandel, Whitianga and Whangamata.

Proposed services

Waihi Beach-Paeroa & Thames - Ngātea - Paeroa - Te Aroha 
Consultation is happening in 2022 about a 2-hourly Waihi Beach to Paeroa route and a morning and afternoon return service from Thames to Te Aroha via Ngātea and Paeroa, with connections to Hamilton, to start in 2023.

Raglan-Whale Bay 
Waikato District Council is considering an Inter-Raglan service.

Kāwhia-Hamilton 
A 2022 Plan proposes to reintroduce at least daily bus.

Patronage

Only 0.9% of Waikato trips were made by bus in 2013/14, compared with 2.3% nationally. Since then the number of passengers in Hamilton dropped from 4.37m, to 4.01m in 2018/19. The 2018 census travel to work statistics showed 5% travelling by bus in Hamilton and 2% in Waikato, but a 2020 report showed 1% bus use in Hamilton in 2018.

Totals of rural and urban passenger journeys per financial year in Waikato
Sources 1962–76, 1991–95, 1996–2001, 2002–2007, 2008, 2009/10, 2011/12, 2013/14, 2014/15, 2016, 2017, 2018, 2019, 2020, 2021.

In the year to March 2016 patronage in Hamilton was down 6.4% to 3,636,214 and declined a further 5.3% in Hamilton, and 4.1% on satellite routes, to February 2017. Hamilton patronage was down 0.5% in the year to July 2018, but up 0.19% with satellite routes included. COVID-19 resulted in a 41.3% fall in 2020.

This table shows patronage by routes for the year to January 2017, Bee card records at the Transport Centre between 22 and 28 February 2021 and 2021 year -

Overcrowding 
Patronage varies greatly, with all seats taken on the Orbiter at rush hours and over 60% full on the Northern Connector (serving Huntly and The Base), Raglan and Silverdale routes. However, a dozen routes have less than a quarter of seats taken in an average rush hour. Over 1,300 buses were full to capacity in 2015/16, 482 of them on the Orbiter route. This has provoked complaints, particularly concerning the infrequent Raglan bus, which was fully loaded 22 times in 2015/16.

Infrastructure

Transport Centre 

Most of Waikato's buses start and end their journeys at the Transport Centre on the corner of Anglesea St and Bryce St, formerly the Ellis and Burnand timber yard. The map of the Centre shows 27 stops in and around it. As well as bus stops and shelters, it has toilets, a cafe, an information counter and a booking office. It opened in 2001 and was designed by Worley Architects. Prior to that the Transport Centre was the name later given to the late 1960s bus station on the other side of Bryce St (now The Warehouse, but once the NZR Road Services depot and bus stops), which was linked by a ramp to the underground station at Hamilton Central. That site and the current centre and neighbouring properties are now included in Development Site 4 in the City's local area plan. In earlier years buses had several terminals, including Frankton Junction and Garden Place.

Bicycle racks 

The camber of Bryce St at the exit from the Centre was a reason for Hamilton being the largest city in the country not to carry bicycles on any of its public transport. The entrance was modified to avoid buses gouging the tar seal on Bryce St, but there is still little clearance to allow for bike racks. This probably explained why a 2011 policy to "investigate the feasibility of bikes on buses in the Waikato region" was not in the 2015 Plan. Cycle racks have been on Huntly, Paeroa and Raglan buses from 18 April 2017, Cambridge buses from late 2017 and Te Awamutu from late 2018. A Regional Council agenda recommended its Regional Public Transport Plan 2018 – 2028 should not provide for bike racks on Hamilton buses.

Wheelchair accessible buses
In 2014 $4 million spent on 10 low-floor MAN buses made the Hamilton fleet fully wheelchair accessible. A Total Mobility subsidised taxi scheme also operates in Hamilton, Taupō and Tokoroa. Local mobility schemes exist in Huntly, Raglan, Coromandel, Thames, Tairua, Whitianga, Paeroa, Morrinsville, Te Aroha, Cambridge, Te Awamutu, Tokoroa, Putāruru, Tīrau, and Te Kuiti.

Information technology 

A smartcard marketed as a BusIt Card was introduced in 2003. It gave roughly a 30% discount. About 40,000 (10% of Waikato's population) were in use. Cards cost $5. A switch to Bee Cards was made on 1 July 2020.

In 2017/18 solar-powered, real-time arrival information boards were installed at 5 bus stops and CCTV and wifi on buses. The Transit app was introduced in 2017, allowing mobile phone users to track buses and plan journeys.

Funding 
When fares were increased by 12½% and buses after 6pm and all Sunday services were ended in 1971, Buses Ltd claimed to be losing about $26,000 a year. The options then mooted were tax cuts, or local or national subsidy.

Under the Public Transport Management Act 2008 (which replaced the Transport Services Licensing Act 1989), regional councils can manage bus and ferry services within their regions. Since 2013, this has been under the Public Transport Operating Model. Just over a third of operating costs come from fares.

A Passenger Transport Rate was first levied in Hamilton in 1994. In 1996 it collected $1.033m, in 1997 $1.077m, in 1998 $1.187m, in 1999 $1.275m, $1.278m in 2001, in 2001 $1.453m, in 2002 $1.519m, in 2005 $3,626m, in 2007 $5.503m, and $6.237m in 2008. By 2003 only 3 (Raglan, Te Awamutu and Thames) of 33 routes ran without subsidy. Fare revenue was $3.606m in 2007 and, after a fare increase, $4.178m in 2008. Contracted services cost $2.199m in 1995, $2.255m in 1996, $2.798m in 1997 ($1.902m bus, $0.285m mobility), $3.042m in 1999, and was estimated at about $20m a year in the 2015–2025 Plan.

In 2016/17 total funding was $23,34m. In 2019/20 public transport made up 4% of regional government spending on transport, less than half the 11% being spent on the Waikato Expressway. $22.4m went to bus services, $17.8m of that in Hamilton, $4m for buses from rural towns to Hamilton and $0.6m for buses in Thames, Tokoroa and Taupō. In 2020 $18.2m went to Hamilton buses, $4.2m to buses from rural towns, $1.4m for the rest of region and $6m for the new rail service.

A Regional Petrol Tax, levied in Hamilton (0.265 cents a litre in 1996), supported public transport from 1992 to 1996. A plan to reintroduce the tax was dropped in 2009, leading to a fare increase and shelving of improvements planned for increased hours, an Eastern Loop and a Rototuna Dial a Ride. The tax was also levied from 1971 to 1974.

Staffing 
In December 2016, it was reported that Pavlovich Coachlines passengers would receive free rides due to a worker protest.

In October 2017 First Union presented a petition to Regional Council asking for contracts with bus companies to include a requirement to pay a living wage. It was reported that some drivers were being paid the minimum wage. Drivers have been paid at Living Wage rates since 1 September 2021.

Late running 

In Waikato an 'on-time' service is defined as being no more than 59 seconds early and no more than 4 minutes and 59 seconds late. During 2019-2020 overall punctuality improved from 60.35% of buses to 73.3%. One route dropped as low as 21.62%, but improved when timings were eased by 10 minutes from 4 March 2019. By comparison, Auckland reported 97.8% of trips as punctual.

History 

Public transport in Waikato started with ships and boats serving rivers, coastal beaches and ports. Those on the Waikato and Waipa were gradually displaced by the extending North Island Main Trunk railway and its branches. As roads developed, coaches started to link railway stations with other settlements.

From about 1915 service cars replaced coaches, though there were many accounts of poor roads (see External links). By 1924 the service car network was more extensive than the current services. In 1929 the Northern Steamship Co ended its passenger services, which had served ports such as Coromandel, Kāwhia, Port Waikato, Raglan, Tairua, Thames and Whangamata. Some services were suspended during World War 2 due to rubber and petrol shortages.

Waikato had only one passenger tram route and that just from 1871 to 1874. In 1906 Hamilton's mayor proposed a tram to link with Frankton Junction, but voters rejected it.

The Land Transport Act 1998 added transport to Regional Council's responsibilities.

See also (railways, etc) 
Public transport in New Zealand
Railways: North Island Main Trunk, Glen Afton Branch, Glen Massey Line, East Coast Main Trunk, Cambridge Branch, Thames Branch, Kinleith Branch, Rotorua Branch.

References

External links 
Service cars and poor roads – 
 1920s Waihi-Tauranga and 
 1923 Paeroa-Hamilton
 1924 Rangiriri

Photos –

1920s Green bus fleet
1986 Buses Ltd – blue and white liveries
2010 commentary and photos

Hamilton
Waikato
Bus transport in New Zealand
Transport in Waikato